The Kingdom of Galkot was a petty kingdom in the confederation of 24 states known as Chaubisi Rajya. Lieutenant colonel James Achilles Kirkpatrick described the kingdom as a "considerable fort and town". It was ruled by the Malla kings.

See also
 Galkot Durbar

References 

Chaubisi Rajya
Galkot
Galkot
History of Nepal
Galkot